Events from the year 1737 in France.

Incumbents 
Monarch: Louis XV

Events
 
 
 The fall of Germain Louis Chauvelin, who is removed from office.

Births
 Henriette Anne Louise d'Aguesseau, salon hostess (d. 1794)
 Jacques-Henri Bernardin de Saint-Pierre, botanist (d. 1814)
 Marguerite Du Londel, ballerina (d. 1804)
 Marie-Catherine de Maraise, businesswoman (d. 1822)

 
 Anne Couppier de Romans, royal mistress (d. 1808)

Deaths
 Victor-Marie d'Estrées, marshal (b. 1660)
 François Lemoyne, painter (b. 1688)

See also

References

1730s in France